Haya Ke Daaman Main (lit: On Haya's lap) is a Pakistani romantic television soap opera first aired on 30 March 2016 on Hum TV. Written by Adam Azeen, it is directed by Syed Wahab Jaffari. It is produced by Momina Duraid in the MD Productions company. It airs every Monday to Friday 7:30 pm PST. It is edited by Muhammad Adeel Khalid and Ikhlaq Ahmad. Its chief editor is Mahmood Ali and assistant editors are Saqib Qureshi and Bilal Javed. The show later reran on Hum Sitaray.

Outline 
The story is about Haya (Sukaina Khan), who is the daughter of (Muhammad Qavi Khan), younger sister of Aarish (Syed Waseem Tirmaizi) and Farid (Hannan Samed). She is friend of Rija (Mariyam Nafees) who is in love with Babar (Hammad Farooqui), son of (Fazila Qazi). Aarish is to marry Mizna (Nida Khan) who is disliked by Haya & Rija. This leads to bring sadness in Haya's life. While her brother, Farid is married to Laina, sister of Shan (Jahanzeb Khan) and daughter of (Fouzia Mushtaq). Mizna is daughter of Mehmood (Behroze Sabzwari) and Ismat (Ambar Wajid). Her mother Ismat is a relative of Anwari (Afshan Qureshi). Conditions change when Haya, who hates Babar marries him and breaks Rija's heart. Babar's grandma, who holds a hatred for Babar's mother, convinces Babar to marry Rija in order to kick Haya out and win against his mother. Haya's brother Farid ( Hanan Samed) goes to Rija's house and blames her for trying to marry Babar and destroying Haya's marriage. Babar gets written permission from a broken Haya so that he can finally marry Rija. Rija's parents become angry with her and lock her in a room until Babar's grandmother calls the police and has Rija's father arrested. Babar marries Rija and a rivalry ensues between Haya and Rija who were once best friends, Haya keeping her marriage together and Rija forcefully taking Haya's place.

Cast 
 Sukaina Khan as Haya
 Mariyam Nafees as Rija
 Nida Khan as Mizna
 Waseem Tirmaizi as Aarish
 Hanan Samed as Farid
 Behroze Sabzwari as Mehmood
 Ambar Wajid as Ismat
 Afshan Qureshi as Anwari
 Jahanzeb Khan as Shan
 Fouzia Mushtaq as Laina & Shan's mother (Dead)
 Hammad Farooqui as Babar
 Fazila Qazi as Mahjabeen
 Beena Chaudhary as Rija's mother
 Muhammad Qavi Khan as Azeem; Haya, Aarish & Farid's father (Dead)
 Afraz Rasool as Arslan
 Sangeeta as Babar and Arslan's grandmother

See also 
 List of programs broadcast by Hum TV
 2016 in Pakistani television

References

External links 
 Hum TV Official Website
 Hum TV Official VOD Channel

Hum TV
Hum Network Limited
Hum TV original programming
2016 in Pakistani television
Urdu-language television shows
2016 Pakistani television series debuts
2016 Pakistani television series endings